Suel may refer to:

 Suel, ancient name for Fuengirola, Spain
 Suel A. Sheldon (1850–1926), American politician
 Suloise, a fictitious human race in Dungeons & Dragons 
 Torsten Suel (born 1966), American computer scientist